Greenwich Park was a railway station opened in 1888 by the London, Chatham and Dover Railway (LCDR) in Greenwich, south-east London. The station was originally called Greenwich and the LCDR intended it to rival a nearby station also named  which was owned by the South Eastern Railway (SER) and which had opened over 50 years earlier.

Despite being in a prime location (on Stockwell Street) the LCDR station failed to attract sufficient passengers, possibly because the rival SER station offered a shorter journey time into central London. In 1899 the LCDR was amalgamated with the SER (as the South Eastern & Chatham Railway), and in 1900 the LCDR station was renamed Greenwich Park to distinguish it from the SER's original Greenwich station.

Due to wartime economy measures, Greenwich Park was closed in 1917. The section between Lewisham Road and Greenwich Park was officially abandoned in 1929.

After 1929 the station was demolished and the cutting occupied by the trackbed and platforms was infilled. Today the site is occupied by a hotel and its car park.

Opening

The LCDR chairman explained to shareholders: "We should not have spent £450,000 to get to the bottom of Blackheath Hill. The raison d'etre was to get to the heart of Greenwich. Everybody knows what the Greenwich traffic is; it is an astounding traffic." The station opened on 1 October 1888 and was aligned to join the South Eastern Railway (SER) at a junction east of the existing SER Greenwich station.

Description

Greenwich station had three curved platforms and an engine release road. The platforms had awnings covering more or less their whole length. There were an engine siding and inspection pit behind the signal box, which was at the station throat. The station was below street-level in a cutting, as was most of the line from Blackheath Hill. The station building was a generous brick structure with a booking hall, refreshment room and first and second class ladies' rooms leading off it. Stairs led down to the concourse at the head of the platforms.

The stationmaster's house was situated in Burney Street.

Services

In January 1899 there were 43 arrivals and 55 departures on a weekday, 21 on a Sunday. Most terminated at Nunhead but some ran into St. Paul's (now called Blackfriars) or Victoria in central London. By 1913, the station now named Greenwich Park, there were 55 arrivals and 43 departures, 11 on a Sunday. The journey time from Nunhead was nine minutes. Through-trains to St. Paul's took around 30 minutes.

It is likely that most trains were formed of four-wheel carriages headed by a D class 0-4-2T engine. In 1913 a P class 0-6-0T with a bogie coach at each end appeared on the branch, and this ran the last passenger train, on 31 December 1916. Photographs show P class No. 325, D class No. 89 Hecate and coaching set 271 worked the line at some point.

After closure

Greenwich Park station was closed on 1 January 1917. In 1926 the London & Home Counties Traffic Advisory Committee accepted Southern Railway's view that the branch line should be closed permanently.

The station building survived until the 1960s having been used as a billiard hall and builder's offices. Portions of bridge wall remain in Burney Street and Peyton Place. A short section of embankment survives between Brookmill Road and the South Eastern main line through St Johns station.

References

Further reading
 
 

Disused railway stations in the Royal Borough of Greenwich
Former London, Chatham and Dover Railway stations
Railway stations in Great Britain opened in 1888
Railway stations in Great Britain closed in 1917
Railway station